Ray Shaw may refer to:
 Ray Shaw (English footballer) (1913–1980), English footballer and football manager
 Ray Shaw (Australian footballer) (born 1954), Australian rules footballer and coach
 Ray Shaw (journalist) (?–2009), chairman of American City Business Journals
 Ray Shaw (politician) (born c. 1946), member of the Montana House of Representatives